Airoux is a commune in the Aude department in the Occitanie region of southern France.

The inhabitants of the commune are known as Airouxois or Airouxoises

Geography

Localisation 
Airoux is within the urban area of Castelnaudary situated in the Lauragais on the Rigole de la plaine. It is located some 5 km north-west of Castelnaudary and 15 km south-east of Villefranche-de-Lauragais. It can be accessed on road D217 from Labastide-d'Anjou in the south through the village and continuing north-east to Soupex. There is also the D1 road from Montmaur in the northwest which also passes through the village and continues south-east to Ricaud. The commune consists entirely of farmland with no other villages or hamlets.

Numerous streams cover the entire commune with the Rigole of the Canal du Midi passing through the northern part of the commune and forming part of the northern border. An unnamed watercourse forms the whole western border between the Rigole and the Fresquel river which forms the southern border of the commune. Numerous other unnamed streams and watercourses flow to the Fresquel from the commune to the south, south-east, and east.

Neighbouring communes and villages

Heraldry

Administration
List of Successive Mayors of Airoux

Mayors from 1935

Population

Distribution of Age Groups
The population of the commune is younger than the average for the Aude department.

Percentage Distribution of Age Groups in Airoux and Aude Department in 2017

Source: INSEE

Sites and monuments

The commune has two sites that are registered as historical monuments:
The Chateau of Airoux (16th century)
A Cemetery Cross (16th century)

See also
Communes of the Aude department
County of Razès
Cantons of the Aude department
Arrondissements of the Aude department

References

External links
Airoux on Géoportail, National Geographic Institute (IGN) website 
Areons on the 1750 Cassini Map

Communes of Aude